Sylvain Salières (1865-1920) was a French-born sculptor.

Biography
He was born in Escornebœuf in Gers, France in 1865. He was one of several French artists that Whitney Warren helped to immigrate to the United States. He stayed in New York for five years, and then moved to Pittsburgh, where he served as head of the School of Sculpture at the Carnegie Institute of Technology until his death in Pittsburgh in 1920.

Works
Among his notable works are the ornamentation of Grand Central Terminal in New York City (completed in 1913) and the sarcophagus of John Paul Jones in Annapolis, Maryland. His work on Grand Central included ornaments and inscriptions around the Glory of Commerce sculptural group on the headhouse exterior, sculpted lunettes in the ceiling of the Main Concourse, ornamental bands on the ceiling of Vanderbilt Hall, foliage carvings above each train gate in the Dining Concourse, and metalwork on the various grills, frames, doorways, and moldings throughout the station.

References

1865 births
1920 deaths
19th-century French sculptors
20th-century French sculptors
20th-century French male artists
19th-century French male artists
French architectural sculptors
Prix de Rome for sculpture
French male sculptors